Thonnance-lès-Joinville (literally Thonnance near Joinville) is a commune in the Haute-Marne department in north-eastern France.

In literature 

In Ken Follett's historical novel A Column of Fire, 16th century Thonnance-lès-Joinville is the birthplace of the character Pierre Aumande, depicted as having been born there as the bastard son of a parish priest and in later life trying to escape this humble origin and forge for himself a position at the Royal Court in Paris.

See also
Communes of the Haute-Marne department

References

Thonnancelesjoinville